Dorai Harrison (born 1 September 1998), known professionally as M24, is a British rapper. He began his musical career in 2016, releasing his debut mixtape, Drip N Drill, in 2020.

Career
M24 began his musical career in 2016. In 2017, he released "Do It & Crash" alongside Skengdo & AM, which gained 2.5 million views on YouTube.

In 2019, M24 released his breakout single "We Don't Dance", which featured Stickz. The song resulted in M24 being able collaborate with larger UK artists. In 2020, he would announce that his debut mixtape, Drip N Drill, was to be released in August the same year; the mixtape included features from Pop Smoke and Sneakbo. The mixtape was released on 21 August 2020 and peaked at number 81 on the UK Albums Chart.

In 2020, M24 released "London", which featured Tion Wayne; the song peaked at number 32 on the UK Singles Chart and was certified silver by the British Phonographic Industry. He was also featured on "Dumpa" by Ill Blu alongside Unknown T, which peaked at number 70.

In 2021, M24 released a remix of "No Cap" alongside Pop Smoke, which appeared on the soundtrack for Boogie. He was also featured on "Payslips" by Swarmz alongside Bugzy Malone, which peaked at number 76.

In 2022, M24 released "Knock Knock" with Tion Wayne, which peaked at number 21. A remix to the song was released in March, featuring HAZEY, Sneakbo, MIST, Jordan and Trillz CB.

Legal issues
On 1 September 2021, M24 was arrested for being in possession of a knife. He was sentenced to six months in prison on 24 September. In addition, he was given a Knife Crime Prevention Order (KCPO) that banned him from inciting violence on social media and from entering portions of his neighbourhood. He was released in December after serving three months.

Discography

Mixtapes

Singles

As lead artist

As featured artist

Guest appearances

Filmography

Television

References 

1998 births
English male rappers
People from Brixton
Rappers from London
UK drill musicians
Gangsta rappers
Living people